Squeaky Wheel Film & Media Art Center (Buffalo Media Resources INC) is an artist-run, non-profit, media arts center based in Buffalo, New York. Founded in 1985, the organization provides the Western New York region with low-cost media equipment rentals, media arts education for youth and adults, residencies for artists and researchers, and exhibitions, screenings, and other public programming. Since 2017, Squeaky Wheel has been certified by Working Artists and the Greater Economy (W.A.G.E.).

Past exhibitions
 Wenhua Shi. A Year from Monday. June–September 2016.
Kathy High. Soft Science: Science Fictions by Kathy High. November 2016–January 2017.
Sondra Perry. flesh out. January–May 2018.
Angela Washko. The Game: The Game 2.0. September–December 9, 2017. 
belit sağ. Let Me Remember. January–April 2018.

References

External links

Mass media in Buffalo, New York
Culture of Buffalo, New York
1985 establishments in New York (state)
Arts organizations established in 1985
Experimental film
Video art